The Eastern & Oriental Express is a luxury train that carries passengers between Singapore, Malaysia, and Thailand.

It runs between Singapore's Woodlands Train Checkpoint and Bangkok, stopping at Kuala Lumpur, Butterworth, and Kanchanaburi, taking 4 days (3 nights). Since 2007 the train has also travelled between Bangkok and Vientiane, the capital city of Laos.

The train is operated by Belmond Limited. It runs approximately 32 trips that either embark upon or disembark from Bangkok yearly, between the months of September and April, only four are hosted by famous guest chefs such as Ian Kittichai.

Fares on the Bangkok to Singapore train in September 2022 (four days, three nights) start at US$2,948. All meals were included in the travelling fare but alcoholic drinks cost extra.

History 
In September 1993 the Eastern and Oriental Express made its inaugural journey between Bangkok to Singapore.

Rolling stock 

The train was built by Hitachi and Nippon Sharyo in Japan in 1972 and operated as the Silver Star in New Zealand. All 31 carriages were later operated by Orient-Express Hotels, which in 2014 changed its name to Belmond Limited. Twenty-four carriages were regauged from New Zealand's  gauge to  gauge for Thai and Malaysian railway lines by A & G Price of Thames, New Zealand. An extensive internal rebuild and fit-out plus exterior painting and badging was undertaken by the new owners at their (then) newly constructed maintenance depot on KTMB land in Singapore's Keppel Road rail yards. The design of the remodelling was by Gérard Gallet, the man behind much of the design and refurbishment of other Belmond products such as the Belmond British Pullman and the Venice-Simplon Orient Express.

The train consists following carriages, from which only a maximum of 21 are operated at once:
 six Pullman sleeping cars (SD 313, SD 318, SD 322, SD 323, SD 328, SD 388), which have six cabins with bunk-bed or single occupation - this comfort category is not offered on the six-night program
 seven State sleeping cars (ST 312, ST 332, ST 333, ST 362, ST 363, ST 366, ST 368), which have four twin-bed compartments
 a Presidential sleeping car (SP 369) with two twin-bed cabins - more spacious bedrooms and bathrooms than State cabins
 three dining cars (RS 381, RS 392, RS 399) with kitchen and tables that seat two or four - however only one or two carriages running in a train
 one bar car (BR 389) with piano and another one (OB 398) with a large open-air observation deck
 a saloon car (PN 393) with library room, gift shop and additional dinner seating facilities
 two staff sleeping cars (SE 338, SE 339)
 a power car (GR 336)
The train is fully air-conditioned, and each compartment has an en-suite bathroom with shower and WC. Haulage is provided by common SRT and KTM diesel engines.

The layout of many carriages and the comfort classes were also used for the designing of the Great South Pacific Express (now to be used as Belmond Andean Explorer).

Train schedule
The Eastern and Oriental Express operates nine routes. In 2010, it began new all-inclusive tour programs of six nights. For example, Epic Thailand starts and ends in Bangkok, and visits a number of villages, temples, and Chiang Mai before returning to Bangkok.

The busiest route is Singapore–Bangkok:

References

External links
 Eastern & Oriental Express Luxury Train - Official Website
 Train journeys on the Eastern & Oriental Express and Thailand's 'Death Railway' - Daily Telegraph.

Passenger rail transport in Singapore
Passenger rail transport in Malaysia
Passenger rail transport in Thailand
International named passenger trains